Badr Lama (born Badro Lamas or Badro el A‘ma, 23 April 1907 - 1 October 1947) was a Palestinian  actor born in Chile. He appeared in more than twenty films from 1928 to 1947, including the 1941 film Saladin.

References

External links 

1907 births
1947 deaths
20th-century Chilean male actors